"Long Live ASAP" (stylized as Long Live A$AP) is a song by American hip hop recording artist ASAP Rocky featuring English-Australian electronic musician Kučka, released on December 18, 2012 as the first promotional single from his debut album Long.Live.ASAP. The song was produced by both Jim Jonsin and Rico Love, with co-production from Finatik & Zac, Frank Romano and ASAP Rocky himself, under the pseudonym LORD FLACKO.

Music video
The music video was released on December 23, 2012 and was directed by Samantha Lecca and ASAP Rocky.

Track listing
 Digital single

Charts

Certifications

Release history

References

2012 songs
2012 singles
ASAP Rocky songs
Kučka songs
RCA Records singles
Song recordings produced by Jim Jonsin
Songs written by ASAP Rocky
Songs written by Frank Romano
Songs written by Jim Jonsin
Songs written by Kučka
Songs written by Rico Love